2014–15 Season Play-off for the 2014–15 Hong Kong football season is the 3rd season of the tournament. It will be held in May 2015. All matches will take place at Mong Kok Stadium in Mong Kok, Kowloon.

The play-off semi-finals are played in one match each, contested by the teams who finished in 2nd and 3rd place in the Premier League table, the winners of the Senior Challenge Shield and the champions of the FA Cup. The winners of the semi-finals go through to the finals, with the winner of the final gaining participation for the 2016 AFC Cup group stage.

As Kitchee won the FA Cup and Eastern won the Senior Shield, as well as coming in 2nd place in the Premier League, teams therefore finishing in 4th and 5th place in the Hong Kong Premier League entered.

Qualified

Premier League

Senior Challenge Shield

The winners of the Senior Challenge Shield will guarantee a place in the play-off.

Winners:
 Eastern

FA Cup

The winners of the FA Cup will guarantee a place in the play-off.

Winners:
 Kitchee

Calendar

Bracket

Fixtures and results

Semi-finals

Final

References 

Football competitions in Hong Kong
Season Play-off